The 1928 Norwegian Football Cup was the 27th season of the Norwegian annual knockout football tournament. The tournament was open for all members of NFF, except those from Northern Norway. The final was played at Halden Stadion in Halden on 14 October 1928, and was contested by the defending champions Ørn and the four-time former winners Lyn. Ørn successfully defended their title with a 2–1 victory, securing their third Norwegian Cup trophy.

Rounds and dates
 First round: 5 August. 58 games, 2 teams had walkovers. 118 teams in total.
 Second round: 12 August. 27 games, 5 teams had walkovers.
 Third round: 26 August.
 Fourth round: 2 and 9 September.
 Quarter-finals: 16 and 23 September.
 Semi-finals: 30 September and 7 October.
 Final: 14 October.

First round

|-
|colspan="3" style="background-color:#97DEFF"|Replay

|}

Second round

|}

Third round

|}

Fourth round

|-
|colspan="3" style="background-color:#97DEFF"|Replay

|}

Quarter-finals

|-
|colspan="3" style="background-color:#97DEFF"|Replay

|}

Semi-finals

|-
|colspan="3" style="background-color:#97DEFF"|Replay

|}

Final

See also
1928 in Norwegian football

References

Norwegian Football Cup seasons
Norway
Cup